Nestorellus is a moth genus in the family Autostichidae. It contains the species Nestorellus meyricki, which is found in Uzbekistan.

References

Symmocinae